Siete años de matrimonio  also known as 7 años de matrimonio, is a Mexican film written by Natalia Armienta Oikawa and directed by Joel Núñez. Starring by Ximena Herrera and Víctor González. It was premiered on January 25, 2013.

Plot 
A romantic comedy that has the ups and downs of a couple to hold marriage when honeymoon with his insatiable rabbit is a thing of the past. Most only last seven years! According to who? It is a fetish or actually is the circle of life? Every seven years all is renewed. The cells of your body change, biologically we are new people; It changes the lyrics, taste and... the genetic interest is lost. Alberto deeply loves Ana and believes that relationships are based on respect but Pepe, his best friend, writes that they are based on diamonds and viagra.

Cast 
Ximena Herrera as Ana
Víctor González as Alberto
Cristián de la Fuente as Bernardo
Roberto Palazuelos as Pepe
Alex Sirvent as Franco
Yolanda Andrade as Luna
Jacqueline Andere as Adriana
María Sorté as Edna
Alejandra Procuna as Tessie
Jorge Campos as Jorge
Arturo García Tenorio as Sergio
Daniela Savala as Abogada
Daniel Villar as Emmanuel
Katherine Porto as Laura

References

External links 

2013 drama films
2013 films
Mexican drama films
2010s Mexican films
2010s Spanish-language films